Pardosa maisa is a wolf spider species in the genus Pardosa found in Finland, Austria, Hungary, Czech Republic, Poland and Russia.

See also 
 List of Lycosidae species

References 

maisa
Spiders of Europe
Spiders of Russia
Spiders described in 1982